Eustache Le Sueur or Lesueur (19 November 161730 April 1655) was a French artist and one of the founders of the French Academy of Painting. He is known primarily for his paintings of religious subjects. He was a leading exponent of the neoclassical style of Parisian Atticism.

Training and career
He was born in Paris, where he spent his entire life. His father, Cathelin Le Sueur, a turner and sculptor in wood, placed him with Vouet, in whose studio he rapidly distinguished himself.

Admitted at an early age into the guild of master-painters, he left them to take part in establishing the French Royal Academy of Painting and Sculpture in 1648 and was elected as one of the original twelve elders in charge of its administration.

Some paintings, illustrative of the Hypnerotomachia Poliphili, which were reproduced in tapestry, brought him notice, and his reputation was further enhanced by a series of decorations (Louvre) in the mansion of Lambert de Thorigny, which he left uncompleted, for their execution was frequently interrupted by other commissions. Amongst these were several pictures for the apartments of the king and queen in the Louvre, which are now missing, although they were entered in Bailly's inventory (1710); but several works produced for minor patrons have come down to us.

In the gallery of the Louvre are the Angel and Hagar, from the mansion of De Tonnay Charente; Tobias and Tobit, from the Fieubet collection; several pictures executed for the church of Saint Gervais; the Martyrdom of St Lawrence, from Saint Germain de l'Auxerrois; two very fine works from the destroyed abbey of Marmoutiers; St Paul preaching at Ephesus, one of Le Sueur's most complete and thorough performances, painted for the goldsmiths corporation in 1649; and his famous series of the Life of St Bruno, executed in the cloister of the Chartreux. These last have more personal character than anything else Le Sueur produced, and much of their original beauty survives in spite of injuries and restorations and removal from the wall to canvas. Le Sueur was a prolific draftsman and many of his chalk drawings are in the Louvre's Cabinet des Dessins.

His pupils, who aided him much in his work, were his wife's brother, Theodore Goussé, and three brothers of his own, as well as Claude Lefèbvre and Pierre Patel the landscape painter. Most of his works have been engraved, chiefly by Picart, B. Audran, Leclerc, Drevet, Chauveau, Poilly and Desplaces.

Style
According to the Encyclopædia Britannica Eleventh Edition, it was considered that Le Sueur's work lent itself readily to the engraver's art, as he had a delicate perception of varied shades of grave and elevated sentiment, and possessed the power to render them. His graceful facility in composition was always restrained by a very fine taste, but his works often fail to please completely, because, producing so much, he had too frequent recourse to conventional types, and partly because he rarely saw colour except with the cold and clayey quality proper to the school of Vouet; yet his St Paul at Ephesus and one or two other works show that he was not naturally deficient in this sense, and whenever we get direct reference to nature—as in the monks of the St Bruno series—we recognize his admirable power to read and render physiognomy of varied and serious type.

Selected works

Notes

References

External links
Life of St. Bruno gallery at the Louvre

1617 births
1655 deaths
French Baroque painters